WMUD-LP is a Freeform formatted broadcast radio station licensed to Moriah, New York, serving the Champlain Valley of New York and Vermont.  WMUD-LP is owned and operated by Champlain Music Appreciation Society, Inc.

External links
 Farm Fresh WMUD Online
 

MUD
MUD-LP
Radio stations established in 2003
2003 establishments in New York (state)